Mother of Cities may refer to:
 Asunción, capital and largest city of Paraguay
 Balkh, among the oldest cities of Afghanistan. See Umm Al-Belaad.
 Prague, capital and largest city of the Czech Republic
 Santiago del Estero, oldest city of Argentina

See also
 Mother city (disambiguation)
 Queen City (disambiguation)